Charee Pineda-Soledad (born Crissha Charity Morrison Pineda on 27 September 1990) is a Filipina actress, politician and one of ABS-CBN's Star Magic artists. Her career began when she was cast as the "sweetilicious" girl on ABS-CBN's defunct teen sitcom Let's Go. She is best known for playing the roles of Marissa Ocampo in Katorse, Jeri Cenarosa in Precious Hearts Romances Presents: Alyna and Rosalie Dimaano in Angelito: Batang Ama and Angelito: Ang Bagong Yugto where she was paired up with JM De Guzman. She has since transferred to GMA Network and has done multiple supporting roles.

As a politician, she is a former councilor of the city of Valenzuela.

Early life and education
Pineda was born on 27 September 1990 as a daughter of Eloy and Precy Pineda. She took her elementary education at the Maysan Elementary School and graduated in 2002. She continued her secondary education at the Colegio Sto. Niño de Valenzuela. For college, she attended the Arellano University, earning a Bachelor of Arts degree majoring in Political Science in 2015. She also finished a two-year course at the SKD Academy for Culinary Arts.

Career
Pineda began her career as a print ad model of beauty products and did freelance modeling jobs. She first appeared as an actress in the GMA-7 afternoon drama show Ikaw Sa Puso Ko as the jealous Mirasol. Becky Aguila took her wings as manager and became a freelancer for a while, working for both networks, ABS-CBN and GMA Network. In 2006, she was seen in the Kapamilya station (ABS-CBN) and became a part of the Saturday Barkada show Let's Go as Charie, the crush ng bayan. She was paired with majority of the guys in the show. Alex Gonzaga, Eda Nolan, Joem Bascon and Mikel Campos are graduates of the said show.

After her stint in Let's Go, Pineda accepted the offer of the Kapuso network to appear in the drama show Impostora as Trish, the other party of the Martin Escudero and Jennica Garcia love team. The writers decided to kill her character because of the conflict between GMA Network and her manager, Becky Aguila. She then moved back to the Kapamilya network and appeared in Lovespell with Gee-Ann Abrahan, Mickey Perz and Bodie Cruz.

In 2008, she won her first major acting award via Alon, a Cinema One Originals 2008 entry, and received the Best Actress award. She is the youngest recipient of the Best Actress award in Cinema One Originals.

In 2011, she played as the main female protagonist in Angelito: Batang Ama as Rosalie Dimaano and again in 2012 in Angelito: Ang Bagong Yugto. This was her last show on ABS-CBN. In 2013, she transferred to GMA Network and was part of the drama series Akin Pa Rin ang Bukas as main antagonist Agatha Morales. In 2014, she starred on the drama series The Borrowed Wife as Maricar. In 2015, she starred on the drama series The Rich Man's Daughter as Angeline San Jose. In 2017, she starred on the fantasy drama series Mulawin vs. Ravena as Savannah Montenegro. In 2018, she starred on the drama series Hindi Ko Kayang Iwan Ka as Rosanna Balagtas.

Politics
Pineda first served as Sangguniang Kabataan (SK) chairman of Barangay Parada, Valenzuela City from 2007 to 2010. She later ran for city councilor of Valenzuela from the 2nd district in 2013 and won. She was re-elected in 2016 and in 2019.

Filmography

Film

Television

Other networks
 Kroko: Takas sa Zoo - IBC
 SPARKada Trip - Studio 23
 The Source with Pinky Webb - CNN Philippines

References

External links
 
Sagad, Cecilia (2007-08-23). "Charee Pineda: Peek-a-boo star". Life & Entertainment stories. Manila Standard Today. Retrieved 2008-04-28
Bautista, Mario E. (2007-08-02). "Dream Factory". Malaya Entertainment. Retrieved 2008-04-28

1990 births
GMA Network personalities
ABS-CBN personalities
Star Magic
Star Circle Quest participants
Arellano University alumni
Living people
Filipino people of American descent
People from Valenzuela, Metro Manila
Actresses from Metro Manila
Metro Manila city and municipal councilors